The 24 Hours of Zolder (24 uur van Zolder in Dutch) is a yearly sports car and touring car endurance race held at Circuit Zolder in Belgium.

The race was initially held in 1983, and has run every year except for 1988.  In 1989 a GT car won for the first time, and the following year the race joined the calendar of the BBL Cup, which became the Carglass Cup in 1992.  The 24 Hours became part of the Belcar championship in 1997 (for a few years named Belgian GT Championship, since 2010 named Belcar Endurance Championship), continuing to be the series' yearly endurance event.

Overall winners

External links
 Official website
 Circuit Zolder
 Racing Records - 24 Hours of Zolder winners

Sports car races
Touring car races
Auto races in Belgium
Endurance motor racing
Circuit Zolder
Recurring sporting events established in 1983
1983 establishments in Belgium